The Negro Folk Symphony is a symphony composed by William L. Dawson and completed in 1934.

The work consists of three movements:

Its world premiere on November 20, 1934, at Carnegie Hall in New York City was conducted by Leopold Stokowski and performed by the Philadelphia Orchestra.

It was recorded by the Detroit Symphony Orchestra conducted by Neeme Järvi in 2001.

Notes

External links 
 

20th-century symphonies
1934 compositions